Fernet con coca ( or , "Fernet and Coke"), also known as fernando, its diminutive fernandito, or several other nicknames, is a long drink of Argentine origin consisting of the Italian amaro liqueur fernet and cola, served over ice. Although typically made with Fernet-Branca and Coca-Cola, several amaro brands have appeared in Argentina since its popularization, as well as ready-to-drink versions.

The cocktail first became popular among the youth of the college town of Córdoba, in the 1980s and—impulsed by an advertising campaign led by Fratelli Branca—its consumption grew in popularity during the following decades to become widespread throughout the country, surpassed only by that of beer and wine. It is now considered a cultural icon of Argentina and is especially associated with its home province of Córdoba, where the drink is most consumed. The popularity of fernet con coca is such that Argentina consumes more than 75% of all fernet produced globally. The cocktail can also be found in some of its bordering countries, like Uruguay.

In 2020, fernet con coca became the first Argentine drink to be recognized as an IBA official cocktail, listed under the name "fernandito" in the "new era drinks" category.

History

Fernet was introduced to Argentina by Italians during the great European immigration wave to the country of the late 19th and early 20th centuries, a period in Argentine history characterized by vast economic growth and rapid social change. The popularity of fernet in Argentina is representative of the lasting influence Italian immigrants had in the broader consumer tastes and culture of the country. Over many years, fernet consumption expanded in an unprecedented way throughout the Argentine territory, although this process is still "confusing and poorly documented". In 1941, Fratelli Branca opened its first and only production plant outside Italy  in the Buenos Aires neighborhood of Parque Patricios, which indicates that already at that time the fernet market in Argentina was considerable. Another underground plant was opened in 1982 in Tortuguitas, Buenos Aires Province. Before the combination with cola became widely popular in the 1990s and 2000s, fernet was traditionally consumed in the country as an apéritif and digestif, and was either drunk as an after-dinner shot, mixed with soda water or as part of a carajillo de fernet, in which some dashes of the bitter are added to a cup of coffee. 

 

Although the exact origin of the cocktail is poorly-documented and "somewhat shrouded in mythmaking", it is generally agreed that it originated in Córdoba Province, and is heavily associated with its capital of the same name, Argentina's second most populous city. Some sources say that the cocktail already existed in the 1950s, as a "gentler" variation of the common combination of fernet and soda water, while others affirm that it was invented in the 1970s by Oscar "el Negro" Becerra, a drummer and bartender from Cruz del Eje, a city in the province's northwest. Another version suggests the drink was invented in Argentina's northern provinces. Fernet con coca began to grow in popularity in Córdoba city during the 1980s, in the period that followed Argentina's return to democracy. Although "theories swirl about who sparked fernet's explosion", most point to the city's large population of university students. By the end of the decade, Fratelli Branca's marketing director noticed the drink's growing popularity in Córdoba and launched a series of national advertising campaigns actively encouraging the combination with Coca-Cola, at first in an "implicit" agreement with The Coca-Cola Company and, between 1994 and 1997, as an official co-branding campaign. Fratelli Branca head of marketing since 1992 Hernán Mutti told Fortune in 2016: "We had to convince Argentina that this was the way to drink fernet: to be shared between friends. It was being drunk behind closed doors; it wasn't a friendly product." The company then "did everything to get people to try fernet and cola on any occasion", promoting the drink with samplings at bars and events and in popular seaside towns along the coastline of the Atlantic, targeting people under the age of 25. The tastings were accompanied by advertising connecting Fernet-Branca to distinctive national landscapes, like Patagonia's Perito Moreno glacier. The campaign is considered one of the most successful marketing strategies in the country's recent history, as it managed to "capture a still incipient consumption in a specific place in the country to popularize it and impose it in the daily life of Argentines." 

In addition to the effective advertising campaign, the popularity of the drink has been linked to other coinciding phenomena: the diversification of the Argentine market for alcoholic beverages and the modernization of cuarteto, a style of popular music from Córdoba that expanded to Buenos Aires during the 1980s and 1990s, spearheaded by singer Rodrigo's success. Furthermore, between 1990 and 2010 the habits of Argentines were transformed as a result of a tumultuous political and economic life, with BBC Mundo's Daniel Pardo writing: "First came the splurge, opulence, and cheap dollar of Carlos Menem's presidency, then a terrible economic crisis in 2001 that triggered poverty, and then three left-wing governments that, in the midst of an export boom, enriched (or subsidized) the poor." Branca brand ambassador Nicola Olianas told the Spirits Business in 2017 that he "has obviously contemplated how to replicate the success in other markets, but wonders whether the conditions in Argentina were somehow unique, with the long-established distillery and the millions of emigré Italians." By the year 2000, consumption had already consolidated in cities such as Tucumán, Mendoza and Buenos Aires, and continued to grow despite the economic crisis of 2001. On the contrary, since 2002 fernet's production and marketing underwent intense transformations, establishing itself as "one of the most striking phenomena in the entire region", making way for women and young people as new consumers and cementing its popularity at bars, parties, asados and gatherings. In Buenos Aires alone, the drink's sales grew by 115% between 2001 and 2008. By 2012, 40 million liters of fernet were produced per year, twice as much as in 2007. According to a 2011 governmental report, fernet consumption in Argentina grew 251% during the 2000s, far ahead of beer's 60%. Another study reported that during the period of Néstor Kirchner and Cristina Fernández de Kirchner's presidencies—between 2004 and 2015—fernet consumption increased 405%, noting that "the kirchnerist decade could also be called 'the fernet decade'." Fernet production in Argentina has been falling consistently since 2015, as part of a widespread economic downturn that began during Mauricio Macri's presidency. Between 2015 and 2019, the Argentine production of fernet and bitters fell from 56.4 to 44.3 million annual liters.

Preparation

Fernet con coca is a long drink, usually served in a tall tumbler such as the highball. Simple in composition, the two-ingredient cocktail comprises just its eponymous ingredients and ice. The result is a black concoction with a "velvety", gold-tinted foam, and a complex and bittersweet taste that features competing and complementary flavors. The exact proportions of each ingredient are debated, and people prepare the cocktail according to personal taste. A popular measurement is three parts fernet and seven parts cola. An early Cordoban version of the drink called "90210"—a possible reference to the 1990s TV drama— calls for nine-tenths of fernet, two ice cubes and one tenth of cola. The International Bartenders Association recipe—first published in 2020—calls for 50 millilitres Fernet-Branca poured into a double old fashioned glass with ice, filled up with cola. 

Fernet-Branca and Coca-Cola are by far the preferred brands and market leaders, although several other local bitters have emerged since the drink's popularization, which include "premium" and cheaper versions, as well as "artisan-made" fernets, and ready-to-drink versions of the cocktail. Over the years, fernet products in Argentina have been "lightened" in relation to the traditional amaros of Italy, as they are now intended for consumption with cola—reducing their bitterness, alcohol content and "syrupy texture".

La Voz explained a typical preparation of fernet con coca: "It carries two or three ice cubes and a variable measure of fernet and cola. It is recommended to serve it with an inclination of 45 degrees and in a long glass so that the soda does not lose gas. The foam should expand to overflow the glass and then contract and stay within the circumference of the glass. On the contrary, if it drips between the sides, the soda was served too quickly and the drink will lose its character, its perfect condition." Some people dump an extra measure of fernet just as the foam is about to leak out of the glass, so that it lowers and does not spill, a practice known as "coronado" (meaning "crowned"). Walkers commonly make a "viajero" (meaning "traveller" in Spanish), using half-cut plastic bottles of Coca-Cola as containers for communal drinking and to carry the cocktail.

Popularity

Despite being a relatively modern phenomenon, fernet con coca has managed to cement itself culturally, and is now regarded as a national symbol and cultural icon of Argentina, as well as the country's "unofficial national drink". 

It is mostly consumed in Argentina, but the cocktail can also be found in some of its neighboring countries, such as Uruguay, Paraguay and Bolivia. Despite its popularity, many Argentines consider fernet con coca to be an acquired taste, and its flavor often repulses foreigners. Some relate the success of the cocktail in the country to a general fondness for the bitter taste in Argentine culture, exemplified by the widespread consumption of mate and non-alcoholic bitters like Terma.

Fernet's popularity extends beyond differences in age, sex or social class, and currently is the third most popular alcoholic beverage in the country, behind  wine and beer. 

The popularity of the cocktail has made Argentina the consumer of 75% of all fernet produced globally, as well as one of the world's highest Coca-Cola consumers, drinking about four times the global average. 

With its long history in the country, the Fernet-Branca brand has achieved a "cultlike" and "almost mythical" status among Argentines. It is by far the most popular fernet brand sold in Argentina, having 79% of the market share, followed by Vittone with 11%, Capri with 7% and 1882 (known as "milocho") with 3%. According to Branca, only 5% of fernet sold in Argentina is drunk on its own, and the rest is used for mixing, largely with cola.

Fernet con coca has been used as a novelty flavoring in ice cream, and alfajores, a local confection. Some companies sell canned "fernet con coca foam" that can be used as a dessert topping or filling.

Three-quarters of the amaros sales are concentrated in "the Interior" provinces, that is, the portion of the Argentine territory that is not part of the Buenos Aires metropolitan area. Fernet consumption per capita increases between 15% and 18% in the Northwest, which includes the provinces of Jujuy, Salta, Tucumán, Catamarca, La Rioja and Santiago del Estero, as the region has a greater historical tradition of herbal liqueur drinking. However, the epicenter of fernet con coca drinking in the country is its home province of Córdoba, which represented almost 30% of national consumption—about three million liters of fernet a year—in 2013. The drink is considered an "emblem" of the province, and a fundamental part of its distinct cultural identity and heritage. Córdoba prides itself on setting its own cultural trends, and fernet con coca has become one of its biggest icons along with rally racing and cuarteto music. The popularity of fernet among Cordobans has been linked to the local custom of consuming herbal medicines such as burro, boldo and peperina. Writing for The New York Times in 2015, Jonathan Gilbert felt that the preference for fernet in Córdoba "demonstrates the extent to which [its inhabitants] revolt against the prevailing cultural and political trends in Buenos Aires, whose inhabitants are called porteños".

In popular culture
Several recording artists, especially from Córdoba, have made reference to the cocktail in their works. In the 1990s, rock band Vilma Palma e Vampiros from Rosario released a song named after the cocktail, which featured the lyrics: "I do not want to end up in a cell without my fernet con coca". Fito Páez names the drink in his song "Las cosas que me hacen bien", off his 2020 album La conquista del espacio.

See also

Argentine cuisine
Italian diaspora
List of cocktails
List of national liquors
South American cuisine

Notes

References

External links

  , official website
 , official English website
  , official Argentine website

Argentine alcoholic drinks
Cocktails with cola
Cocktails with bitters
Córdoba Province, Argentina
Two-ingredient cocktails